Cheduba Island (also known as Manaung Island) is an island in the Bay of Bengal close to Ramree Island and belongs to Myanmar, formerly Burma.

Cheduba had a population of 63,761 as of 1983, composed chiefly of Burmese and Arakanese peoples. The main economic activities on the island are farming and cattle raising.

Geography
It is located between 18° 40′ and 18° 56′ N. lat., and between 93° 31′ and 93° 50′ E. long. The terrain of the island is quite flat with scattered moderate elevations. The highest point  is on a ridge in the southwestern part of the island.

There are 5 villages connected by a road that circles the island: Owa, Thitpon, Manaung, Budaunggwe, Sachet and Meinmangwe. There is an airfield west of Manaung, the main village of Cheduba, located on the northeast coast. Manaung is linked to the village of Kyaukpyu on nearby Ramree Island by steamer.

Most of the vegetation is tropical rainforest. There are mud cones that emit steam and sulfurous fumes on the island, which indicate some volcanic activity. There are also seepages of oil and gas.

Nearby islands
Highest point .
Highest point .

Other islands in the vicinity
Highest point .

History
Cheduba Island was a stop on the coastal trade route from Bengal by which Indian civilization migrated to Myanmar.

Historical records show that an earthquake of a magnitude of 8.5 to 9.0 hit off the western coast of Myanmar in April 1762, and reports speculated that a tsunami could kill more than one million people in Myanmar and Bangladesh. In 1881, a 7.9 magnitude earthquake in the Bay of Bengal caused "broad massive flames of fire" to be emitted on the island. In the 1780s, after the Burmese conquest of the area, Cheduba became a province of Arakan. Cheduba was captured in 1824 by the British, whose possession of it was confirmed in 1826 by the Treaty of Yandabo concluded with the Burmese. The island, along with many other islands in the area, was evacuated and occupied by the Japanese during World War II. An earthquake in 1858 caused an island nearby to disappear.

See also
List of islands of Burma

References

External links

www.manaung.com
Myanmar Articles from  The New York Times

Islands of Myanmar